Sayyed Abdolrahim Mousavi is an Iranian military officer who is Commander-in-Chief of the Islamic Republic of Iran Army since 21 August 2017. He was formerly deputy Chief of General Staff of Armed Forces of the Islamic Republic of Iran. He was also Second-in-Command of the Islamic Republic of Iran Army from 2008 to 2016.

See also 
 List of Iranian two-star generals since 1979

References

Islamic Republic of Iran Army major generals
Commander-in-Chiefs of Islamic Republic of Iran Army
Living people
Al-Moussawi family
Islamic Republic of Iran Army personnel of the Iran–Iraq War
1960 births